Danny Rubin (born 1957) is an American screenwriter and playwright. He wrote the original story, and then co-wrote with Harold Ramis the screenplay for the 1993 comedy film Groundhog Day, for which the two received a BAFTA Award for Best Screenplay.

Early life and education 
Rubin was born in San Francisco, the son of Melvin Rubin, an ophthalmologist, and Lorna (née''' Isen), owner of a publishing business, and grew up in Gainesville, Florida. His grandfather was Albert Isen, former mayor of Torrance, California. His brother, Michael, is an author and sister, Gabrielle, a visual artist.

Rubin received a B.A. in biology from Brown University and a M.A. in radio, television, and film from Northwestern University.

 Career 
Rubin wrote the original story, and then co-wrote with Harold Ramis the screenplay for the 1993 comedy film Groundhog Day, for which the two received a BAFTA Award for Best Screenplay.  He co-wrote Hear No Evil released the same year.  With Jefery Levy, he co-wrote the 1995 film S.F.W. 

Rubin has taught screenwriting at numerous universities and lectured on the topic at academic conferences since 1995. He was a Briggs-Copeland Lecturer on English at Harvard University.

 Filmography 

 Writer 
 Groundhog Day (with Harold Ramis) (1993)
 Hear No Evil (with Randall M. Badat and Kathleen Rowell) (1993)
 S.F.W. (with Jefery Levy) (1994)
 È già ieri (Italian remake of Groundhog Day) (2004)

Stage
 Groundhog Day (2016 musical)

 Awards 

 Nominated 
 Saturn Award for Best writing 1994: Groundhog Day Tony Award for Best musical 2017: Groundhog Day The Musical Won 
 BAFTA Film Award for Best Screenplay 1994: Groundhog Day ALFS Award for screenwriter of the year 1994: Groundhog Day''

Books

References

External links 
 
 
 Danny Rubin's Column
 Interview about Groundhog Day and screenwriting at Big Think

1957 births
Living people
20th-century American Jews
American male screenwriters
American musical theatre librettists
21st-century American dramatists and playwrights
American male dramatists and playwrights
20th-century American male writers
21st-century American male writers
Screenwriting instructors
Brown University alumni
Northwestern University School of Communication alumni
Harvard University staff
20th-century American screenwriters
Best Original Screenplay BAFTA Award winners
21st-century American Jews